Mechanicsville, New Jersey may refer to:

Mechanicsville, Hunterdon County, New Jersey
Mechanicsville, Middlesex County, New Jersey
Mechanicsville, Monmouth County, New Jersey